Tiago Fernandes (born January 29, 1993) is a former Brazilian tennis player. He achieved the No. 1 ranking on the ITF Junior Circuit. Fernandes was coached by Larri Passos, the former coach of Brazilian former world #1 and three-time French Open winner Gustavo Kuerten.

Fernandes won the Boys' Singles division of the 2010 Australian Open, defeating Sean Berman of Australia in the final, 7–5, 6–3.

Tennis career

Junior ranks

2009
In 2009, he competed in his first Grand Slam in the Boys' Singles division of the 2009 French Open. He first competed against Cedrick Commin, winning 7–5, 6–1, in the second round he lost Richard Becker 6–3, 7–5, 6–3. In 2009 Wimbledon Championships, he reached the third round losing to Devin Britton, 7–5, 6–4. At the 2009 US Open, he reached the Quarterfinals, where he lost to Bernard Tomic 6–1, 6–4, from Australia.

2010
At the Junior Australian Open, he became the first Brazilian to win a Junior Grand Slam, defeating Sean Berman 7–5, 6–3 in the final. During the tournament he played against many other higher seeded players like Gianni Mina, in the semifinals where he won 4–6, 7–6, 6–2.

Fernandes was fifth seed at the Junior French Open, reaching the quarterfinals where he lost to eventual champion, Agustín Velotti, 7–6(0), 6–1.

As the No. 3 seed at the Junior Wimbledon Championships, Fernandes defeated local wildcard Tom Farquharson in the first round and American qualifier Dane Webb in the second round. He lost to eventual finalist, Australian qualifier Benjamin Mitchell in the third round, 5–7, 4–6.

Fernandes represented Brazil at the 2010 Summer Youth Olympics in the tennis competition. He defeated Peter Heller 6–1, 5–7, 6–4 in the first round and Jozef Kovalik 7–6(3), 6–1 in the second round to advance to the quarterfinals, where he lost to Victor Baluda, 2–6, 6–7(5). He and his doubles partner Renzo Olivo defeated Heller and his partner Kevin Krawietz, 6–3, 7–5 to advance to the doubles quarterfinals, where they lost to Diego Galeano and Ricardo Rodriguez.

Fernandes entered the Junior US Open as the No. 3 seed, defeating American wildcard Mitchell Kreuger in the first round 6–0, 6–1, and Mate Pavić in the second round, 6–3, 7–6(5), leading to a rematch with Victor Baluda. After dropping the first set 4–6, Fernandes took the second 6–4, but lost the final set 3–6. He reached the semifinals in the Junior US Open doubles competition with his compatriot Guilherme Clézar, defeating the top seeds, Márton Fucsovics and Mate Zsiga in the second round.

Senior career

2010

After winning his junior Australian Open title, Fernandes elected to play senior tournaments. He lost in the first round of qualifying at the Prime Cup Aberto de São Paulo challenger and the Brasil Open in Costa do Sauípe and U.S. Men's Clay Court Championships in Houston, ATP 250 events.

He played several ITF Futures tennis tournaments in Brazil, reaching the semifinals at the Brazil F4, losing to Marcel Felder, 4–6, 6–4, 4–6, and the quarterfinals at the Brazil F7, losing to Leonardo Kirche, 2–6, 1–6.

To prepare for the junior Wimbledon Championships, Fernandes played at the UNICEF Open, losing in the first round of qualifying to Aisam-ul-Haq Qureshi, 1–6, 5–7.

Fernandes entered qualifying for the Beijing International Challenger, defeating Jia Li and Hsin-Han Lee to reach the main draw, where he won his first challenger match, defeating Kaden Hensel. Despite losing 4–6, 4–6 to Andrey Kumantsov in the round of 16, Tiago earned 13 points toward his ATP ranking, moving him up 117 spots to a career high ranking of 645.

He received a wild card to play the Samarkand Challenger, drawing top seed Blaž Kavčič in the first round.

Fernandes plays most of his ITF Futures events in his home country of Brazil. He matched his best ever Futures result at the Brazil F28, reaching the semifinals and losing a tight match against the top seed Andre Miele, 7–6(5), 5–7, 5–7.

He received a wild card in to the main draw in the 2010 Copa Petrobras São Paulo challenger, coming back from a set and a break deficit to defeat fellow Brazilian Augusto Meirelles to win 3–6, 7–5, 6–0, saving three match points. He lost to Nicolas Devilder in the following round.

2011
As the winner of the junior slam the previous year, Fernandes received a wild card into the 2011 Australian Open qualifying draw, suffering a leg injury in his 2–6, 0–6 loss to Evgeny Korolev. After a nearly two-month recovery period that caused him to miss out on the 2011 Brasil Open, he qualified for the main draw at both the 2011 All Japan Indoor Tennis Championships and the 2011 ATP Challenger Guangzhou challengers, reaching the round of 16 at both, which gave him a career high ranking of 509.

Fernandes received a wild card into the main draw at the 2011 Pernambuco Brasil Open Series, and faced lucky loser Tiago Lopes, defeating him 6–4, 4–6, 6–2. He played another up-and-coming Brazilian teenager, Bruno Sant'anna, in the second round, saving set points in the first set. He faced another Brazilian teenager, his friend Guilherme Clezar, in the quarterfinals, winning 6–4, 3–6, 7–6(3), breaking Clezar as he served for the match to force the final set tiebreak. His biggest victory came against the fourth seed, Júlio Silva. Dropping the first set 2–6, Fernandes fought back following a rain delay and relocation to indoor facilities to win the next two sets, and the match, 2–6, 7–5, 7–6(2), taking him to a career high of 380 in the world. Citing fatigue and back pain, he withdrew from the final against Tatsuma Ito, and will instead prepare for his next tournament, the 2011 Aberto Santa Catarina De Tenis.

2014

In August, Fernandes announced his retirement to focus on his college work.

Junior Grand Slam finals

Singles:13 (1 title)

ATP Challenger and ITF Futures finals

Singles: 2 (1–1)

Doubles: 6 (1–5)

References

External links

1993 births
Australian Open (tennis) junior champions
Brazilian male tennis players
Living people
Sportspeople from Florianópolis
People from Maceió
Tennis players at the 2010 Summer Youth Olympics
Grand Slam (tennis) champions in boys' singles